Melvin G. Massucco (November 22, 1925 – March 23, 2002) was an American football player and coach. He served as the head football coach at the College of the Holy Cross in Worcester, Massachusetts from 1965 to 1966 and at Worcester Polytechnic Institute, also in Worcester, from 1967 to 1977, compiling a career college football coaching record of 33–70–3.

Prior to serving at the head coach at Holy Cross, Massucco served as a defensive coach and scout under Hall of Fame coach Eddie Anderson. As an athlete, Massucco was selected by the Chicago Cardinals in the 1952 NFL Draft.

Head coaching record

Ice hockey

Football

References

External links
 

1925 births
2002 deaths
American football halfbacks
Holy Cross Crusaders football players
Holy Cross Crusaders football coaches
WPI Engineers football coaches
UMass Minutemen football coaches
UMass Minutemen ice hockey coaches
People from Arlington, Massachusetts
Sportspeople from Middlesex County, Massachusetts
Players of American football from Massachusetts